Chinderah is a town in the Tweed Shire. It is located south of Tweed Heads and next to the seaside township of Kingscliff. An industrial estate, golf course and small shopping precinct are located within the area.

History
First surveyed in 1863, Chinderah developed into a centre of agriculture with sugarcane as a major industry, currently a source of rum. South Sea Islanders later arrived and became victims of slavery for the recruitment of blackbirding.

The town was bisected by the Pacific Highway in 1996.

In 2022, as a result of heavy rainfall, Chinderah was battered by floods when the Tweed River broke its banks at a recorded peak.

Demographics
In the 2016 Census, Chinderah recorded a population of 1,566 people, 47.9% female and 52.1% male. The median age of Chinderah residents was 60 years, 22 years above the national median of 38. Aboriginal and Torres Strait Islander people made up 7.6% of the population. 75.4% of Chinderah residents were born in Australia and 91.5% of people spoke only English at home. The most common responses for religion were No Religion 25.9%, Anglican 23.3% and Catholic 22.8%.

References

Suburbs of Tweed Heads, New South Wales
Towns in New South Wales